Ahmed El Shamsy is a professor of Islamic thought at the University of Chicago.

Biography
Shamsy received his Ph.D. in 2009 from Harvard University. His works examine the historical development of classical Islamic disciplines and academic culture. His studies focus on orality and literacy, the history of the book, and the theory and practice of Islamic law. He has been at the University of Chicago since 2010.

Works
 Rediscovering the Islamic Classics: How Editors and Print Culture Transformed an Intellectual Tradition
 The Canonization of Islamic Law: A Social and Intellectual History

See also
 Behnam Sadeghi
 Walid Saleh

References

University of Chicago faculty
Year of birth missing (living people)
Living people
Harvard University alumni
Scholars of Islamic jurisprudence